Jordan Payne (born 25 March 1993) is a New Zealand rugby union player who currently plays as a midfield back for the  in Super Rugby. and  in the ITM Cup.

Career

He was also named as a member of the Chiefs development squad for the 2014 Super Rugby season. After impressing coaches in the development set-up, he took advantage of a number of injuries to Chiefs back-line players and made his Super Rugby debut on 12 April 2014 in a 22–16 win for his side over the Melbourne Rebels in Hamilton.

References

New Zealand rugby union players
Rugby union centres
Chiefs (rugby union) players
Waikato rugby union players
1993 births
Living people
People educated at Sacred Heart College, Auckland
Rugby union players from Auckland
Green Rockets Tokatsu players
New Zealand expatriate rugby union players
Expatriate rugby union players in Japan
New Zealand expatriate sportspeople in Japan